The 7th parallel north is a circle of latitude that is 7 degrees north of the Earth's equatorial plane. It crosses Africa, the Indian Ocean, South Asia, Southeast Asia, the Pacific Ocean, South America and the Atlantic Ocean.

Around the world
Starting at the Prime Meridian and heading eastwards, the parallel 7° north passes through:

{| class="wikitable plainrowheaders"
! scope="col" | Co-ordinates
! scope="col" | Country, territory or sea
! scope="col" | Notes
|-
| 
! scope="row" | 
| Passing through Lake Volta
|-
| 
! scope="row" | 
|
|-
| 
! scope="row" | 
|
|-
| 
! scope="row" | 
|
|-
| 
! scope="row" | 
| For about 6 km
|-
| 
! scope="row" | 
|
|-
| 
! scope="row" | 
| For about 17 km
|-
| 
! scope="row" | 
|
|-
| 
! scope="row" | 
|
|-
| 
! scope="row" | 
|
|-
| 
! scope="row" | 
| 
|-
| 
! scope="row" | 
|
|-
| 
! scope="row" | 
|
|-
| style="background:#b0e0e6;" | 
! scope="row" style="background:#b0e0e6;" | Indian Ocean
| style="background:#b0e0e6;" |
|-
| 
! scope="row" | 
| Northern Thiladhunmathi Atoll
|-valign="top"
| style="background:#b0e0e6;" | 
! scope="row" style="background:#b0e0e6;" | Indian Ocean
| style="background:#b0e0e6;" | Laccadive Sea - passing just north of the island of Kelaa, 
|-
| 
! scope="row" | 
| Passing just north of Colombo
|-
| style="background:#b0e0e6;" | 
! scope="row" style="background:#b0e0e6;" | Indian Ocean
| style="background:#b0e0e6;" | Bay of Bengal
|-
| 
! scope="row" | 
| Andaman and Nicobar Islands - island of Great Nicobar
|-
| style="background:#b0e0e6;" | 
! scope="row" style="background:#b0e0e6;" | Indian Ocean
| style="background:#b0e0e6;" | Andaman Sea
|-
| 
! scope="row" | 
| Passing just south of Hat Yai
|-
| style="background:#b0e0e6;" | 
! scope="row" style="background:#b0e0e6;" | Gulf of Thailand
| style="background:#b0e0e6;" |
|-
| style="background:#b0e0e6;" | 
! scope="row" style="background:#b0e0e6;" | South China Sea
| style="background:#b0e0e6;" |
|-
| 
! scope="row" | 
| Sabah, island of Borneo - for about 6 km
|-
| style="background:#b0e0e6;" | 
! scope="row" style="background:#b0e0e6;" | South China Sea
| style="background:#b0e0e6;" | Marudu Bay
|-
| 
! scope="row" | 
| Sabah, island of Borneo - for about 3 km
|-
| style="background:#b0e0e6;" | 
! scope="row" style="background:#b0e0e6;" | Sulu Sea
| style="background:#b0e0e6;" | Passing just south of Malawali Island, 
|-
| 
! scope="row" | 
| Island of Cagayan de Sulu
|-
| style="background:#b0e0e6;" | 
! scope="row" style="background:#b0e0e6;" | Sulu Sea
| style="background:#b0e0e6;" |
|-
| 
! scope="row" | 
| Island of Mindanao (Zamboanga Peninsula)
|-
| style="background:#b0e0e6;" | 
! scope="row" style="background:#b0e0e6;" | Celebes Sea
| style="background:#b0e0e6;" | Moro Gulf - passing just north of Sacol Island, 
|-
| 
! scope="row" | 
| Island of Mindanao
|-
| style="background:#b0e0e6;" | 
! scope="row" style="background:#b0e0e6;" | Davao Gulf
| style="background:#b0e0e6;" |
|-
| 
! scope="row" | 
| Island of Samal
|-
| style="background:#b0e0e6;" | 
! scope="row" style="background:#b0e0e6;" | Davao Gulf
| style="background:#b0e0e6;" |
|-
| 
! scope="row" | 
| Island of Mindanao
|-
| style="background:#b0e0e6;" | 
! scope="row" style="background:#b0e0e6;" | Pacific Ocean
| style="background:#b0e0e6;" | Philippine Sea
|-
| 
! scope="row" | 
| Island of Peleliu
|-
| style="background:#b0e0e6;" | 
! scope="row" style="background:#b0e0e6;" | Pacific Ocean
| style="background:#b0e0e6;" | Passing just south of Truk Lagoon, 
|-
| 
! scope="row" | 
| Parempei island (just to the north of Pohnpei island)
|-valign="top"
| style="background:#b0e0e6;" | 
! scope="row" style="background:#b0e0e6;" | Pacific Ocean
| style="background:#b0e0e6;" | Passing just south of Ailinglaplap Atoll,  Passing just south of Majuro atoll, 
|-
| 
! scope="row" | 
| Arno Atoll
|-valign="top"
| style="background:#b0e0e6;" | 
! scope="row" style="background:#b0e0e6;" | Pacific Ocean
| style="background:#b0e0e6;" | Passing just south of Jicarón island, and the Azuero Peninsula, 
|-
| 
! scope="row" | 
|
|-
| 
! scope="row" | 
| For about 18 km
|-
| 
! scope="row" | 
|
|-
| 
! scope="row" | 
|
|-
| 
! scope="row" | Disputed area
|-
| 
! scope="row" | 
| Island of Wakenaam
|-
| style="background:#b0e0e6;" | 
! scope="row" style="background:#b0e0e6;" | Atlantic Ocean
| style="background:#b0e0e6;" |
|-
| 
! scope="row" | 
|
|-
| 
! scope="row" | 
|
|-
| 
! scope="row" | 
|
|-
| 
! scope="row" | 
|
|-
|}

See also
6th parallel north
8th parallel north

n07